The Roller Coaster Yard Sale, sometimes referred to as the Roller Coaster Fair, is an outdoor second-hand sale held annually for three days beginning the first Thursday in October. It takes place along several U.S. and state routes in southern Kentucky and northern middle Tennessee.

Event description and history
The event was started by Sarah Ann Bowers in 1986. The reason that Bowers started the event is that she wanted to improve the beautiful Cordell Hull Highway (Kentucky Routes 63 and 90 in Barren County) and needed to prove that the road was very well traveled in the area. In 2001, over 140,000 travelers visited the area from miles around just to take in yard sales along the specific routes.

In 2002, the yard sale routes extended into Clay, Overton, and Pickett counties in Middle Tennessee. Soon after that US 127 in Clinton County, Kentucky and Kentucky Route 90 from Clinton County through Burkesville to Glasgow and Cave City, Kentucky were added to the Roller Coaster Fair itinerary to make the event go completely around the Dale Hollow Lake area.

Roller Coaster Fair's designated routes
The Roller Coaster Fair takes place at several booths located along these routes listed below.

South-Central Kentucky (Leg 1)
KY 63 (which is recognized as a Kentucky Scenic Byway) from Glasgow, Barren County, KY to Tompkinsville, Monroe County.
KY 163 from downtown Tompkinsville to Hestand to the Tennessee State line.

Middle Tennessee
Tennessee State Route 51 entire route from the TN-KY border to Moss, Clay County, Tennessee
Tennessee State Route 52 from Moss to Celina to Livingston (Overton County, Tennessee)
Tennessee State Route 111 (formerly TN 42) from Livingston, through Byrdstown, Pickett County, to the US 127 Junction at the TN-KY border near Static, Kentucky and Tennessee

South-Central Kentucky (Leg 2)
US 127 in Clinton County from Static, through Albany, to the unincorporated community of Snow.
KY 90 from Snow through Burkesville (Cumberland County) and Marrowbone, to Summer Shade (Metcalfe County), back to Glasgow, all the way to its western terminus at the junction with KY 70 and Interstate 65 at Cave City, Kentucky, about  short of Mammoth Cave National Park.

See also
127 Corridor Sale
400-Mile Sale

References

External links
Rollercoasterfair.com: Roller Coaster Fair website
Rollercoasterfair.com:  Roller Coaster Fair Brochure

 

Annual events in Kentucky
Annual events in Tennessee
October events  
Retail markets in the United States 
Kentucky Route 63 
Kentucky Route 90
Tennessee State Route 52 
Tennessee State Route 111  
U.S. Route 127
Barren County, Kentucky 
Glasgow, Kentucky 
Monroe County, Kentucky 
Tourist attractions in Kentucky 
Tourist attractions in Tennessee